Flavius Strategius Apion Strategius Apion (died between 577 and 579) was a patrician and jurist of the Byzantine Empire, and the sole Roman consul of the year 539. He was a member of the wealthy and prominent Apion family of Oxyrhynchus, Egypt.

Biography
Strategius Apion was son to a senior Strategius. He had a son also known as Strategius, named in one of the Oxyrhynchus Papyri. This son and his wife Eusebia maintained friendly relations with Pope Gregory I, mentioned in his extant correspondence. The youngest Strategius was not the only heir of Apion mentioned in the latter's will. He shared his inheritance with Praejecta, another Apion, and Georgius. An interpretation of the text suggests Praejecta was the widow of Apion, while Strategius, Apion, and Georgius were their three sons.

Strategius Apion is mentioned variously as consul, vir illustris, and comes domesticorum during the 530s. He was a contemporary with the emperor Justinian I, by whom he is named in terms of high commendation in the 82nd Novell of Justinian's Novellae Constitutiones, on account of the excellent discharge of his legal duties as the assessor of Marcellus. Texts from circa 547-548 mention him as a patrician. Texts from circa 548/549 to 550/551 mention him as dux of the Thebaid. This position typically came with the honorific title of patrician. He is called patrician in a text dated to 556, indicating he had already received the title. He was mentioned at the time as stratelates and pagarch of Arsinoe. This placed him in charge of the pagarchy local to Oxyrhynchus and its vicinity.

The Oxyrhynchus Papyri preserve information as to the extent of the familial estates and the business affairs relating to them. John Malalas also mentions a residence of Apion in Constantinople for an incident in May 562, when certain persons of the House of Apion hurled verbal insults at the Green faction of the Hippodrome. Apion is presumed active in the Byzantine Senate when present at the capital, Constantinople. He is last mentioned alive in 577, mentioned as already deceased by 579.

References

Sources

 

6th-century Byzantine people
6th-century Roman consuls
570s deaths
Year of birth unknown
Year of death uncertain
Patricii
Imperial Roman consuls
Apion family
6th-century jurists
Byzantine jurists